Blown Away may refer to:

 Blowing from a gun, execution by cannon

Film and television 
 Blown Away (1993 film), an American erotic thriller film
 Blown Away (1994 film), an American action film
 Blown Away, a 2014 Australian documentary film about Cyclone Tracy, by Danielle MacLean
 Blown Away (TV series), a 2019–present Canadian glassblowing reality competition show

Literature 
 Blown Away, a 1986 novel by Ronald Sukenick
 Blown Away, a 1996 Hardy Boys Casefiles novel
 Blown Away, a 2005 children's novel by Patrick Cave
 Blown Away, a 2006 Hardy Boys Undercover Brothers novel

Music

Albums
 Blown Away (album), by Carrie Underwood, or the title song (see below), 2012
 Blown Away, by Elements, 1985
 Blown Away, by the Wolfhounds, 1989

Songs
 "Blown Away" (Bachelor Girl song), 1999
 "Blown Away" (Carrie Underwood song), 2012
 "Blown Away", by Akon from Konvicted, 2006
 "Blown Away", by DMX from Year of the Dog... Again, 2006
 "Blown Away", by Jeff Lynne from Armchair Theatre, 1990
 "Blown Away", by King Swamp from King Swamp, 1989
 "Blown Away", by the Pixies from Bossanova, 1990
 "Blown Away", by Tech N9ne from Sickology 101, 2009
 "Blown Away", by Tripping Daisy from Bill, 1992
 "Blown Away", by Warrior Soul from Last Decade Dead Century, 1990

See also 
 "Blew Away", a song by Smashing Pumpkins, a B-side of "Disarm"
 "Blow Away", a 1979 song by George Harrison
 "Blow Away", a song by A Fine Frenzy from Bomb in a Birdcage
 "Blow Away", a song by Kate Bush from Never for Ever